Oriya is a Unicode block containing characters for the Oriya (Odia), Khondi, and Santali languages of the state of Odisha in India. In its original incarnation, the code points U+0B01..U+0B4D were a direct copy of the Oriya characters A1-ED from the 1988 ISCII standard. The Devanagari, Bengali, Gurmukhi, Gujarati, Tamil, Telugu, Kannada, and Malayalam blocks were similarly all based on their ISCII encodings.

Odia script combines symbols into hundreds of consonant ligatures.

Block

History
The following Unicode-related documents record the purpose and process of defining specific characters in the Oriya block:

References

Unicode blocks
Odia language